Field & Stream is a retailer of hunting, fishing, camping, and related outdoor recreation merchandise that is a subsidiary of Dick's Sporting Goods. The company's logo date of "1871" references the origination of Gordon & Ferguson Merchandising Company, who sold clothing under the brand "Field and Stream" starting in 1915. Dick's purchased licensing rights to the name from Gordon and Ferguson's successors in 2012.

History
On August 16, 2013, Dick's Sporting Goods opened its first Field & Stream Shop in Cranberry Township, Pennsylvania, at the site of the former Dick's location in Cranberry (Dick's had moved to a newer location nearby in Cranberry Township in 2012), operating as a competitor to Cabela's. Willie Robertson of the reality television series Duck Dynasty made a speaking appearance at a wedding at the store, with both participants dressed in camouflage, as well as retired WWE wrestler Shawn Michaels (currently hosting MacMillan River Adventures on the Outdoor Channel) appearing at the store to sign autographs for the grand opening. Later in the month, the store began selling AR-15 semi-automatic rifles, ending the chain's 2012 self-imposed suspension of sales of certain semi-automatic firearms following the Sandy Hook Elementary School shooting.

The first locations opened after the Cranberry store were in Erie, Pennsylvania (on the site of a proposed Cabela's store that Dick's had purchased before Cabela's had a chance to buy it), Altoona, Pennsylvania, and Crescent Springs, Kentucky. On October 10, 2014, a newly constructed Field & Stream Shop opened in Miamisburg, Ohio, and Horseheads, New York. The Miamisburg store opened its doors on October 8, 2014, although the official opening was not until October 10, 2014.

In October 2019, the Utah based company Sportsman's Warehouse acquired eight Field & Stream stores. In March 2020, the company acquired two additional stores.

In 2021, the original Field & Stream store in Cranberry Township was replaced by Dick's newest concept called Public Lands, which is similar to Field & Stream in concept but places emphasis on local conservation efforts.

References 

Sporting goods retailers of the United States
Firearm commerce
American companies established in 2013
Retail companies established in 2013
2013 establishments in Pennsylvania